Aramark Corporation is an American food service, facilities, and uniform services provider to clients in areas including education, healthcare, business, prisons, and leisure. It operates in North America (United States and Canada) and an additional 20 countries, including the United Kingdom, Germany, Philippines, South Korea, Chile, the Republic of Ireland, and Spain.

The company is headquartered in Center City, Philadelphia, Pennsylvania. Aramark's revenues totaled US$14.604 billion in 2018, and the company was listed as the 27th largest employer on the Fortune 500.

History

Davidson Brothers and beginnings of ARA 
Aramark was founded as Davidson Brothers in 1936 by Davre and Henry Davidson. Davidson Brothers began by providing vending services to plant employees in the aviation industry in Southern California.

In 1959, Davre Davidson partnered with William Fishman to establish ARA (Automatic Retailers of America), which became publicly traded a year later in 1960. In 1968, ARA provided services at the Mexico City Olympic Games, the first of 16 Games they have serviced, including Athens in 2004 and Beijing in 2008. In 1969, ARA amended its name and became known as ARA Services, intended to reflect its growing range of businesses. In 1983, Joseph Neubauer was elected CEO of ARA Services, and a year later, Neubauer led a group of executives to fend off a hostile takeover bid by coordinating a management buyout.

Rename to Aramark and 2006 Neubauer takeover 
ARA Services changed its name again to its present name, Aramark, in 1994. In 2001, Aramark returned to the New York Stock Exchange as a public company under the RMK ticker. In 2006, a group of investors led by Neubauer (and including CCMP Capital, Goldman Sachs Capital Partners, Thomas H. Lee Partners, and Warburg Pincus) proposed the acquisition of all outstanding shares of the Aramark Corporation, which was approved by shareholders. The merger was completed in 2007.

Acquisitions, innovations and present leadership 
Since the 2000s after its renaming, Aramark has increased its frequency of acquisitions, mostly in the US and Ireland. Its first was in 200, Aramark purchased the concessions arm of the Ogden Corporation for $225 million in cash and $11 million in assumed debt, expanding its business to locations that included several major sports league venues, such as Staples Center in Los Angeles, and the Arrowhead Pond and Edison International Field in Anaheim. Aramark followed this with a 2004 acquisition of a 90% stake in Campbell Catering, an Irish firm. Two years later, Aramark acquired Seamless (today a subsidiary of Grubhub), though it sold its stake in 2012. The company then acquirted Van Houtte USA from Green Mountain Coffee Roasters (today part of Keurig Dr Pepper) in 2011, and the Irish firm Avoca Handweavers in 2015.

Aramark additionally gained traction in the press for its innovations starting in 2009. In July of that year, Aramark and the Colorado Rockies opened what is believed to be the first gluten-free concession stand in major league baseball. By 2010, Aramark made gluten-free foods available at all 12 of its major league baseball accounts. Aramark partnered with The Humane Society in August 2017 as part of their initiative to increase plant-based food offerings for consumers. The training partnership includes a series of plant-based culinary trainings over a six-month period.

In May 2012, Aramark announced that its board of directors had elected Eric J. Foss as CEO and that Neubauer would remain the company's Chairman. In December 2014, Joseph Neubauer announced his retirement and Foss was elected as the company's next chairman. Foss remained as CEO until his retirement in August 2019; he was succeeded by John Zilmer in October that same year. Between the tenure of Foss and Zilmer, Aramark created a position of "Office of the Chairman" consisting of Lauren Harrington, Stephen Sadove, Lynn McKee and Bramlage Stephen to handle day-to-day operations, until a new CEO was found. 

On May 10, 2022, Aramark announced they would spin off its Uniform Services division into an independent, publicly traded company. The move is expected to be complete by the end of Fiscal Year 2023.

Purchasing 
Aramark negotiates pricing and makes purchases directly from national manufacturers and through distributors such as Sysco Corporation. The products range from healthcare, dairy, meats, seafood, frozen, canned and dry, paper & disposables, chemicals & janitorial, supplies & equipment, produce, and beverage. Aramark has had distribution agreements with Sysco for more than 20 years.

In 2016, Aramark strengthened its purchasing power through acquiring the group purchasing organization HPSI.

Controversies

FY2018 management bonuses
Three days before FY2018 management bonus payouts were to be paid, an internal communication told the management team that performance bonuses were postponed for three months.  No explanation was ever given.  This follows the company's 401k match at the plan minimum after a “phenomenal” year as reported by the CEO Eric Foss.

Labor law violations
In April 2010, Aramark and the Coalition of Immokalee Workers reached a resolution that called for a 70−80% increase in wages for tomato pickers.

Aramark has also been the subject of a number of scandals regarding labor practices and business ethics. These include firing workers for reporting unsanitary food conditions, paying fringe wages, not paying for all hours worked, not paying backpay, and firing or eliminating the positions of those who file Equal Employment Opportunity Commission (EEOC) claims.

Food safety issues
In 2013, an investigation by Pulitzer Prize–winning journalist Chris Hedges discovered that the food provided to inmates at Burlington County Jail in New Jersey was substandard and spoiled, and often made prisoners sick with diarrhea and vomiting. Maggots found in the food preparation areas at Parnall Correctional Facility in Jackson, Michigan, may have been the source of an outbreak of food-borne illness. Maggots were also found in Aramark food products at Michigan's Charles Egeler Reception & Guidance Center and two Ohio prisons, the Ohio Reformatory for Women and Trumbull Correctional Institute. Aramark, however, was cleared by the Michigan Department of Corrections of any responsibility for inmate illness and for pests in Michigan. Ohio and Michigan fined Aramark $270,000 and $200,000 respectively.

In April 2015, the managing board of The Cavalier Daily, a student-run newspaper at the University of Virginia, reported that Aramark literally "served garbage" to inmates in the Saginaw Correctional Facility in Freeland, Michigan. It also noted that Aramark has in the past "underfed inmates and fed them dog food, worms and scraps of food from old meals" and argued that the university should reconsider its relationship with the food services contractor in light of these ethical issues.  Michigan's oversight of Aramark's performance was criticized as inadequate in a report released in August 2015 by the group Progress Michigan after Michigan moved to end the contract.

Likewise, Aramark has been criticized for skimping portion sizes, food safety issues, and overcharging state governments (Michigan, Kentucky, and Florida) that have used their food in prisons; a Kentucky prison riot is reputed to have been caused by the low quality of food Aramark provided to inmates.

Direct provision asylum centres
In the Republic of Ireland, Aramark has been criticised for its management of three 'direct provision' centres, where those seeking asylum in the Republic of Ireland must stay until their application is complete, sometimes for a matter of years. Activists have called for boycotting Aramark for profiting off the direct provision system, as well as the alleged mistreatment of asylum seekers in Aramark-run centres. In 2014, asylum seekers in County Meath launched a hunger strike over the "unacceptable living standards" in the Aramark-run centre. In 2018, Aramark was forced to apologise after a mother of three from Zimbabwe was refused a slice of bread for her sick child. Soon after, the Union of Students in Ireland (USI) voted to support a boycott of Aramark over its direct provision links, following on from the 'Aramark off our campus' campaigns at Trinity College, Dublin (TCD), University College, Dublin (UCD), and The University of Limerick.

Notable clients

Chicago Public Schools
Aramark has been criticized for the "filthy conditions" in Chicago Public Schools following the privatization of janitorial services and Aramark receiving a $260 million contract for their management. Responding to these reports, Chicago Mayor Rahm Emanuel said "Aramark's job is to clean the schools, so our principals and teachers can focus on their fundamental responsibility: education. They will either live up to that contract and clean up the schools or they can clean out their desks and get out."

Wichita Falls Independent School District
Aramark was hired for $2.65 million per year to provide janitorial services on 28 schools and three administration buildings by the Wichita Falls Independent School District in 2015. The district cancelled Aramark's contract and hired another firm because of numerous complaints about bad service. A report issued by the Wichita Falls-Wichita County Public Health District determined that one high school was infested with rats and mice. Janet Powell, the district's director of support services said, "Everyone on the committee felt lied to and deceived (by Aramark)."

Ohio Department of Rehabilitation and Correction

Since 2013, numerous Aramark employees providing food services in Ohio prisons have been fired or otherwise disciplined for inappropriate behavior towards prisoners such as sexual relations, letter writing, and smuggling contraband. At least 204 Aramark employees have been banned from entering Ohio prisons for such violations. On December 1, 2015, inmates working in the kitchen under Aramark management held a strike because they were required to cut meat with pan lids instead of being allowed to use meat slicers. An Aramark employee was given a written reprimand over the incident.

Since the state started using Aramark in 2013, the Ohio Civil Services Employee Association has been trying to regain control of the food services contract. A bid submitted by the union in spring of 2015 failed after a state review found it did not properly reflect projected costs. Aramark's contract was renewed. The head of the union said Aramark “continues to violate their contract every day with food shortages, health and safety violations, bad employee conduct, low food quality.” As of late 2015, the union was pursuing arbitration against the state over this contract.

In 2014, Aramark was issued two fines totaling $272,200 for contract violations. The state offered to credit money spent on additional employee training towards the fines. The same year nine Aramark employees were fired for contraband violations and 15 were fired for "security violations."

In addition to this an inspection conducted by the Ohio State Corrections officials on 30 June 2014 discovered maggots in the Ohio Reformatory for Women in Marysville. Similar findings occurred in Michigan and Kansas correctional facilities.

See also

 Prison–industrial complex

Notes

References

External links
 
 

1936 establishments in California
2001 initial public offerings
2007 mergers and acquisitions
2013 initial public offerings
Business services companies established in 1936
Catering and food service companies of the United States
Companies based in Philadelphia
Companies listed on the New York Stock Exchange
Food and drink companies based in Pennsylvania
Hospitality companies of the United States
Multinational companies headquartered in the United States